Lepanthes filamentosa is a species of orchid native to Colombia and Ecuador.

References

External links 

filamentosa
Orchids of South America